Six Hours to Live is a 1932 American pre-Code science fiction drama film directed by William Dieterle and starring Warner Baxter, Miriam Jordan and John Boles.

Cast
 Warner Baxter as Capt. Paul Onslow  
 Miriam Jordan as Baroness Valerie von Sturm  
 John Boles as Karl Kranz  
 George F. Marion as Prof. Otto Bauer  
 Halliwell Hobbes as Baron Emil von Sturm 
 Irene Ware as The Prostitute  
 Beryl Mercer as The Widow  
 Edward McWade as Ivan  
 John Davidson as Kellner  
 Edwin Maxwell as Police Commissioner  
 Dewey Robinson as Blucher 
 Eugenie Besserer as The Marquisa  
 Marilyn Harris as Flower Girl  
 Claude King as Conference Chairman  
 Michael Mark as Townsman in Window 
 Torben Meyer as Sturges - Butler  
 John Reinhardt as Masher  
 Bodil Rosing as Greta  
 Michael Visaroff as Monsieur Thereux  
 Wilhelm von Brincken as Reporter  
 Hans Heinrich von Twardowski as Flosky

References

Bibliography
 Solomon, Aubrey. The Fox Film Corporation, 1915-1935. A History and Filmography. McFarland & Co, 2011.

External links
 

1932 films
1932 drama films
1930s science fiction drama films
1930s English-language films
American science fiction drama films
Films directed by William Dieterle
Fox Film films
American black-and-white films
1930s American films